Nebraska Highway 68 is a highway in central Nebraska.  Its western terminus is at an intersection with Nebraska Highway 2 just south of Ravenna.  Its eastern terminus is at an intersection with Nebraska Highway 58 in Rockville.

Route description
Nebraska Highway 68 begins just outside the southern border of Ravenna at an intersection with NE 2.  It heads directly northward through Ravenna, then turns to the northwest just outside the city before continuing to head north.  Further north, it meets NE 82A before turning directly to the east.  The highway then head in a final northeasterly direction into Rockville where it will terminate at an intersection with NE 58.

Major intersections

References

External links

Nebraska Roads: NE 61-80

068
Transportation in Buffalo County, Nebraska
Transportation in Sherman County, Nebraska